Zahra Nemati (born 30 April 1985) is an Iranian Paralympic and Olympic archer. She originally competed in taekwondo before she was paralyzed in a car accident. At the 2012 Summer Paralympics she won two medals, an individual gold and team bronze. She has qualified to compete at both the 2016 Summer Olympics and the 2016 Summer Paralympics. She was the flag bearer at the 2016 Olympics and the postponed 2020 Summer Paralympics in Tokyo where she shared the honour with thrower Nourmohammad Arekhi.

Personal life
Nemati was born in Kerman, Iran. In 2003, she was injured in a car accident, leaving her with spinal injuries and paralysis of both legs.

Sports career
Prior to her injuries, Nemati had been a black belt in taekwondo. She took up archery in 2006 and within six months finished third in the National Championships, competing against able bodied athletes. In para-archery events she competes in the W2 classification.

Nemati was selected to compete for Iran at the 2012 Summer Paralympics, held in London, United Kingdom, where she won two medals, becoming the first Iranian woman to win a gold medal at either the Olympic or Paralympic Games. In the women's recurve W1/W2 event she placed first in the ranking round with a score of 613 and received a bye to the round of 16 where she beat Mariangela Perna of Italy 6–0. In the quarterfinals she defeated Turkey's Gizem Girismen again by a score of 6–0 and advanced to the gold medal match by winning her semifinal against Italy's Veronica Floreno 6–0. Nemati faced Elisabetta Mijno of Italy in the final and secured the gold medal with a 7–3 win. She dedicated her gold medal to "all of the people who prayed for me to achieve this success."

In the women's team recurve, Nemati was part of the Iranian team alongside Razieh Shir Mohammadi and Zahra Javanmard. They placed second in the ranking round with 1646 points and defeated the Czech Republic in the quarterfinals. In the semifinals the Iranian team lost to South Korea by a score of 192–186 but went on to defeat Italy 188–184 in the bronze medal match as Nemati claimed her second medal of the Games.

At the 2013 World Para-archery Championships held in Bangkok, Thailand, she won the gold medal in the women's individual recurve W2 and a bronze medal in the women's team recurve.

In 2015 Nemati made history by securing qualification for both the 2016 Summer Olympics and the 2016 Summer Paralympics to be held in Rio de Janeiro, Brazil. She qualified for the Olympics by placing second in the women's recurve at the 2015 Asian Archery Championships in Bangkok before winning gold at the 2015 Asian Para-archery Championships to qualify for the Paralympics. She is the first archer to qualify for both Games in the same year since Italian Paola Fantato in 1996.

In January 2016 she was selected to be the flag bearer for the Iranian team during the Parade of Nations at the 2016 Summer Olympics opening ceremony.

She competed in the women's individual event at the 2016 Summer Olympics. She placed 49th in the ranking round with a score of 609. She was defeated by Inna Stepanova of Russia in the round of 32. She finished in 33rd place.

Results
Source:

Paralympic Games
1	Individual Recurve - Open	2016	Rio de Janeiro, BRA

1	Individual Recurve - W1/W2	2012	London, GBR

2	Team Recurve - Open	2016	Rio de Janeiro, BRA

3	Team Recurve - Open	2012	London, GBR

World Championships
1	Individual Recurve - Open	2017	Beijing, CHN

1	Individual Recurve - W2	2013	Bangkok, THA

1	Team Recurve - Open	2011	Turin, ITA

2	Individual Recurve - W1/W2	2011	Turin, ITA

3	Team Recurve - Open	2017	Beijing, CHN

3	Team Recurve - Open	2013	Bangkok, THA

3	Team Recurve - Open	2011	Turin, ITA

4	Individual Recurve - Open	2019	's-Hertogenbosch, NED

4	Team Recurve - Open	2017	Beijing, CHN

7	Team Recurve - Open	2013	Bangkok, THA

9	Team Recurve - Open	2019	's-Hertogenbosch, NED

Asian Para Games
1	Team Recurve - Open	2018	Jakarta, INA

2	Individual Recurve - Open	2018	Jakarta, INA

Honors 
Nemati won the 2013 Sport Accord's Spirit of Sport Individual Award.

See also
 List of athletes who have competed in the Paralympics and Olympics

References

External links
 
 

Archers at the 2012 Summer Paralympics
Paralympic archers of Iran
Paralympic gold medalists for Iran
Paralympic silver medalists for Iran
Paralympic bronze medalists for Iran
1985 births
Place of birth missing (living people)
Living people
People from Kerman
Medalists at the 2012 Summer Paralympics
World Archery Championships medalists
Iranian female archers
Olympic archers of Iran
Archers at the 2016 Summer Olympics
Archers at the 2016 Summer Paralympics
Archers at the 2018 Asian Games
Asian Games competitors for Iran
Medalists at the 2016 Summer Paralympics
Paralympic medalists in archery
Medalists at the 2020 Summer Paralympics
21st-century Iranian women
20th-century Iranian women
Medalists at the 2010 Asian Para Games
Medalists at the 2014 Asian Para Games
Medalists at the 2018 Asian Para Games